VOLNÝ, a.s. is a Czech telecommunications company, formerly known as Telekom Austria Czech Republic, a.s. The Dial Telecom Group acquired VOLNÝ in December 2008, when it purchased 100% of the shares in the company from the Austrian company Telekom Austria TA Aktiengesellschaft. Telekom Austria Czech Republic arose out of the merger of Czech On Line, a.s. and ETEL, s.r.o. on 1 October 2007.

The company Czech On Line was founded as an Internet service provider in 1995. In 1999, the company changed the Czech internet market by being the first to provide dial-up internet access for free.

In 2000 Telekom Austria acquired the company Czech On Line, a.s. and transferred it into an alternative telecommunications provider offering all types of fixed line telecommunication services.

The company ETEL, s.r.o. was founded in 1997 and was known as an alternative telecommunication operator offering services mainly in business segment. ETEL has been acquired by Telekom Austria in 2007.

External links
 VOLNÝ

Telecommunications companies of the Czech Republic
Companies based in Prague
Telecommunications companies established in 1995